Shavei Tzion (lit. Returnees to Zion) is a moshav shitufi in northern Israel. Located between Acre and Nahariya and covering 2,000 dunams, it falls under the jurisdiction of Mateh Asher Regional Council.

History

The village was established on 13 April 1938 as part of the tower and stockade settlement scheme. Its founders, immigrants from Rexingen in Germany, arrived during the Fifth Aliyah fleeing from Nazi persecution. The village's construction was financed by Arthur Loewengart, a former resident of Rexingen and wealthy leather manufacturer who immigrated to the United States in 1937. Shavei Tzion is considered one of the most beautiful towns in the Galilee due to its proximity to the Mediterranean Sea.

Seven of the Acre Prison break fighters who were killed during the operation are buried in the local cemetery.

A memorial was erected on the beach in 1999, commemorating the death of 12 IDF naval commandos who fell during an ill-fated mission into Lebanon on 5 September 1997. It is composed of a dozen sandstone slabs leaning on each another, and a separate block carrying the names of the casualties – including a young officer from Shavei Tzion. The wreck of an old ship of the Israeli Navy, Kidon, which had been sunk just offshore as a tourist attraction for scuba divers, has also become a memorial site in recent years after a 2016 remembrance day ceremony organized by a local dive club, at which a memorial of Israeli flags and 12 chairs representing each of the 12 soldiers who died during the operation was set up on the wreck.

Archaeology

In 1955, remains of a Byzantine church were found along the beach path that leads from Acre to Tyre and was dated to the 4th century. The excavations were led by Moshe Prausnitz and the findings included Mosaic floors and walls as well as remains of an Artesian aquifer.

Twin towns

Shavei Tzion has a friendship relationship with:
 Stuttgart, Germany

Gallery

Notable residents
Daliah Lavi

References

External links

Shave Zion Archive Younes & Soraya Nasarian Library, University of Haifa.
70 years to Shavei Zion Ynet
70 years to Shavei Zion, part 2 Ynet

Moshavim
Populated places established in 1938
Agricultural Union
Populated places in Northern District (Israel)
1938 establishments in Mandatory Palestine
German-Jewish culture in Israel